Berhampore is a suburb of Wellington, New Zealand. It lies towards the south of the city, four kilometres from the city centre, and two kilometres from the coast of Cook Strait. It is surrounded by the suburbs of Vogeltown, Newtown, Melrose, Island Bay, Kingston, and Mornington. The suburb was named after Berhampore in Bengal, one of the battlefields at the start of the Battle of Plassey of 1757. Also surrounding Berhampore is the Berhampore Golf Course as well as a very extensive green belt (known as the town belt) with many walkways and tracks connecting outlying areas. The suburb also boasts some of Wellington's best all weather sports fields, on Adelaide Road and the national hockey stadium. Alongside the golf course there is a skateboard/bmx park, right by a kids mountain bike track. Berhampore School opened in 1915.

Residents of Berhampore are both ethnically and socio-economically diverse and contribute to the atmosphere of their surrounding communities. Recent traffic calming by Wellington City Council in Adelaide Road and Luxford Street has helped create a more defined sense of community in Berhampore.

The housing stock in Berhampore is a mix of mostly lower to middle value properties, with examples of most building styles and types seen in New Zealand since European settlement. The Berhampore State Flats, located on Adelaide Road, are a fine example of the international style of architecture. They were designed by F. Gordon Wilson, chief architect at the Department of Housing Construction, and completed in 1938–39.

Demographics 

Berhampore had a population of 3,870 at the 2018 New Zealand census, an increase of 261 people (7.2%) since the 2013 census, and an increase of 273 people (7.6%) since the 2006 census. There were 1,554 households. There were 1,821 males and 2,049 females, giving a sex ratio of 0.89 males per female. The median age was 35.1 years (compared with 37.4 years nationally), with 606 people (15.7%) aged under 15 years, 960 (24.8%) aged 15 to 29, 1,770 (45.7%) aged 30 to 64, and 537 (13.9%) aged 65 or older.

Ethnicities were 68.5% European/Pākehā, 10.7% Māori, 8.6% Pacific peoples, 15.9% Asian, and 8.0% other ethnicities (totals add to more than 100% since people could identify with multiple ethnicities).

The proportion of people born overseas was 34.7%, compared with 27.1% nationally.

Although some people objected to giving their religion, 50.5% had no religion, 31.2% were Christian, 4.2% were Hindu, 3.7% were Muslim, 1.3% were Buddhist and 4.8% had other religions.

Of those at least 15 years old, 1,278 (39.2%) people had a bachelor or higher degree, and 393 (12.0%) people had no formal qualifications. The median income was $31,500, compared with $31,800 nationally. The employment status of those at least 15 was that 1,749 (53.6%) people were employed full-time, 402 (12.3%) were part-time, and 156 (4.8%) were unemployed.

References

Suburbs of Wellington City